The 2013 Vietnamese Cup was the 21st edition of the Vietnamese Cup. It began on the 16 March 2013 and ended on 5 September 2013.

First round

Second round

Quarter-finals

Semi-finals

Final

References 
  Official website
  Results

Vietnamese National Cup
Cup